
Baran may refer to:

People
Baran (name)
Baran (singer) (born 1988), Iranian singer

Places

Europe
Baran, Belarus, a town
Baran, Lublin Voivodeship, a village in Poland
Baran, Świętokrzyskie Voivodeship, a village in Poland
Uroczysko Baran killing fields near Kąkolewnica, Poland
Baran, Russia, several rural localities in Russia

Africa
Baran, Sool, in the Sool province of Somalia
Badhan, Sanaag, in Somalia, also known as Baran
Baran, alternative name of Buraan, a town in Somalia

Asia
Baran district, in the state of Rajasthan in India
Baran, Rajasthan, a city in Baran district, India
Bulandshahr, India, earlier known as Baran
Baran, Khuzestan, a village in Iran
Bārān, alternative name of Borj-e Balan, a village in Markazi Province, Iran
Baran Duz (Castle of Baran), a village in Iran
Baran, Pakistan, a village

Arts and entertainment
Baran (film), by Majid Majidi, released in 2001
Baran, a character in the anime/manga series Dragon Quest: Dai no Daibōken
Baran, Japanese spelling of Varan, a fictional monster lizard

See also
Barran (disambiguation)
Barang (disambiguation)
Borran (disambiguation)
Jhalawar–Baran (Lok Sabha constituency), Rajasthan, India